Idazoxan (INN) is a drug which is used in scientific research. It acts as both a selective α2 adrenergic receptor antagonist, and an antagonist for the imidazoline receptor. Idazoxan has been under investigation as an antidepressant, but it did not reach the market as such. More recently, it is under investigation as an adjunctive treatment in schizophrenia. Due to its alpha-2 receptor antagonism it is capable of enhancing therapeutic effects of antipsychotics, possibly by enhancing dopamine neurotransmission in the prefrontal cortex of the brain, a brain area thought to be involved in the pathogenesis of schizophrenia.

Alzheimer's research 

Mice treated with idazoxan, which blocks the α2A receptor which regulates norepinephrine, behaved similarly to control animals despite still having amyloid-beta plaques in the brain, as a proof-of-concept experiment that dramatically reduced Alzheimer's pathology and symptoms in two mouse models, potentially offering an immediate treatment for this devastating disease.

Synthesis
Note that the literature method claims that the old original patented procedure gives a different reaction product formed through a rearrangement.

The reaction of catechol (1) with 2-Chloroacrylonitrile [920-37-6] (2) gives 2-cyano-1,4-benzodioxan [1008-92-0] (3). Pinner reaction with alcoholic hydrogen chloride leads to the iminoether, (4). Treatment with ethylenediamine [107-15-3] (5) gives the imidazoline ring affording  (6).

See also 
Imiloxan 
 Efaroxan
 Fluparoxan

References 

Alpha blockers
Imidazoline antagonists
Benzodioxans
Imidazolines